Ryland Louis Bouchard (born October 16, 1979) is an American vocalist and musician who has gone through many distinct phases, in which he has incorporated aspects of folk, electronica, jazz, psychedelia and avant-garde rock. Previously known as the Kill Rock Stars recording artist The Robot Ate Me, has been labeled by Daytrotter as "One of the most creative and potentially scary minds of our generation" and by Spin Magazine as "purely artistic, baffling, and almost completely uncommercial".

Biography
Bouchard was born on October 16, 1979, in Los Angeles, California.

The Robot Ate Me

In 2002 he released They Ate Themselves, his first record as The Robot Ate Me and played his first shows in San Diego opening for notable touring acts such as Daniel Johnston, Tegan and Sara, Metric, Stars and The Blackheart Procession. Skyscraper magazine described his first release as "Quite possibly the year's most arresting experimental pop record, They Ate Themselves is a dizzyingly vibrant trip through death and multi-layered dissonance".

The controversial and highly experimental On Vacation was released in 2004 in which Adam Gnade declared "It's not even music outside the margins. Here the margins were never there, and if they were to encroach, The Robot Ate Me would probably up and croak." Punk Planet followed suit describing the album as "A hypnotic two-disc record that will score your twisted nightmares and fanciful dreams." Splendid summarized "It is impossible to understand a Robot Ate Me album from a written description."

After the release of On Vacation in 2004 he signed with Kill Rock Stars and toured the US heavily the next few years playing close to 600 shows in the following three years. His shows relied heavily on audience participation and were known for being fairly unpredictable. As part of his shows he would sometimes be dragged across the floor by attendees, wear masks, scream loudly, have the audience play the supporting instruments for his songs without rehearsal, or abruptly leave after playing one song.

The 2005 release of Carousel Waltz brought a set of minimal American folk songs. The album was lauded by Babysue as a "strangely compelling and uplifting vision of how love affects a person. Soft and focused, these unusual tunes are simultaneously accessible and peculiar. The Robot Ate Me remains one of the most unique acts on the planet. Brimming with credible substance, Carousel Waltz is yet another killer album from an artist who just keeps getting better and better with time..."

2006 brought the avant-garde Good World, which consisted mostly of sparse clarinet lines mixed with minimal percussion and falsetto vocals by Bouchard. Pitchforkmedia asked "Has someone bludgeoned frontman Ryland Bouchard?". And Tinymixtapes declared: "Not since the glory days of punk has an album come and gone so fast and left one with more questions than answers."

Solo work
In 2008 Bouchard released Seeds a hand-crafted limited edition box set with close to two hours of music (divided between an A-Sides CD/vinyl and a B-Sides CD), a DVD of super 8 videos, four 7" vinyl records, letter-pressed lyrics, a hand silk-screened shirt, bag, poster, and a set of illustrations by his longtime collaborator Daniel Gibson. Only 500 copies of the set were made.

In early 2009, Bouchard completed a Take-Away Show video session for La Blogothèque where he performed songs from Seeds.

The 2009 double vinyl release Cowbirds and Cuckoos was released on November 15, 2009, by Swim Slowly Records. The release consists of two hand screen-printed records and photography by Ryland Bouchard. In February 2010 Swim Slowly Records released a digital EP "Better This Than Nothing", a collection of B-Sides from "Cowbirds and Cuckoos".

Super 8
With the release of "Seeds" in 2008 Bouchard also included a DVD worth of videos shot exclusively on Super 8 film. In 2009 he also released a series of Super 8 videos for the "Cowbirds and Cuckoos" release on YouTube. Using mostly a Braun Nizo S580 and Kodak Ektachrome 64T film the videos include footage from various locations throughout Europe, Mexico and the United States. Completed without digital effects the films rely heavily on time lapse, slow motion and other experimental filmmaking techniques.

Discography

Albums/EPs
 They Ate Themselves (Swim Slowly, 2002) as The Robot Ate Me
 Live at the CBC (Swim Slowly, 2003) as The Robot Ate Me
 On Vacation (Swim Slowly, 2004) as The Robot Ate Me
 On Vacation (5 Rue Christine, 2005, Reissue) as The Robot Ate Me
 Carousel Waltz (5 Rue Christine, 2005) as The Robot Ate Me
 Good World (5 Rue Christine, 2006) as The Robot Ate Me
 Seeds Box Set (Swim Slowly, 2008)
 Cowbirds and Cuckoos (Swim Slowly, 2009)
 Better This Than Nothing (Swim Slowly, 2010)
 Only You (Swim Slowly, 2012)
 Hope Rides Alone (Swim Slowly, 2012)
 Bridge By Bridge (Swim Slowly, 2013) as The Robot Ate Me
 Circumstance (Swim Slowly, 2013) as The Robot Ate Me
 Whalers (Swim Slowly, 2017)

Compilation appearances
 Translation. Music. 3, Substandard (2003) – "Plane"
 Yeti 3, Yeti (2005) – "We Were Humans"
 Sur La Mer Samp Le Mer, 5RC / Kill Rock Stars (2006) – "Lynching Luncheon"
 Winter Holiday Album, 5RC / Kill Rock Stars (2006) – "Wonderland"
 ESOPUS 15, ESOPUS (2010) – "Hope Rides Alone"

Band members 
Ryland Bouchard

Past members and contributors
Kevin Michael Mayfield (Guitar, Vocals, Harmonica, Slide Guitar)
Alan Lechusza (woodwinds and orchestral arrangements on Carousel Waltz and Seeds)
Daniel Gibson (completed the artwork for all the albums)
Jay Arner (Drums)
Evan Kuhlmann (Contrabassoon)
David Greenberg (drums)
Are-Jay Hoffman (bass/violin)
William Haworth (drums, horns, synthesizers)
Edan Rosenberg (helped write lyrics for Carousel Waltz)

References

Notes

External links
 
 Ryland Bouchard at MySpace
 The Robot Ate Me at Kill Rock Stars
 [ The Robot Ate Me] at Allmusic
 Swim Slowly Records – Label owned by Bouchard

1979 births
American male singer-songwriters
Living people
American tenors
University of California, San Diego alumni
Musicians from Los Angeles
Singer-songwriters from California
21st-century American male singers
21st-century American singers